A knife switch is a type of switch used to control the flow of electricity in a circuit.  It is composed of a hinge which allows a metal lever, or knife, to be lifted from or inserted into a slot or jaw. The hinge and jaw are both fixed to an insulated base, and the knife has an insulated handle to grip at one end. Current flows through the switch when the knife is pushed into the jaw.
Knife switches can take several forms, including single throw, in which the "knife" engages with only a single slot, and double throw, in which the knife hinge is placed between two slots and can engage with either one. Also, multiple knives may be attached to a single handle and can be used to activate more than one circuit simultaneously.

Current uses
Though used commonly in the past, knife switches are now rare, finding use largely in science experiments where the position of the switch may be plainly seen in demonstration.  The knife switch is extremely simple in construction and use, but its exposed metal parts present a great risk of electric shock, and the switch is subject to arcing when opened at higher voltages, which poses a further risk of shock or burns to the operator and  can cause fires or explosions under certain conditions.

Open knife switches were supplanted by safety switches with current carrying contacts inside a metal enclosure which can only be opened by switching off the power. In modern applications, automatic switches (such as contactors or relays), and manual switches such as circuit breakers are used. These devices use a snap action mechanism which opens the switch contacts rapidly, and feature an arc chute where the arc caused by opening the switch is quenched. These devices also prevent injury due to accidental contact, as all of the current carrying metal parts of the switch are hidden within or surrounded by insulating guards.

References 

 
 

Switches

de:Messerschalter